Judith Todd (born 18 March 1943) is the second daughter of Garfield Todd (1908–2002), Rhodesian Prime Minister 1953-58, and a political activist regarding Zimbabwe. She was married to Richard Acton from 1974 to 1984. Todd was born at Dadaya Mission in Rhodesia. She was educated at Queen Elizabeth Girls School. Her missionary father, Reginald Stephen Garfield Todd, served as Prime Minister of Southern Rhodesia between 1953 and 1958. Her mother, Jean Grace Wilson Todd, designed and implemented the Southern Rhodesian African Educational System.

Todd was a political activist from the early 1960s when she joined the Black Nationalist movement by becoming a member of the National Democratic Party (NDP) which was formed in 1960. She later joined the Zimbabwe African People's Union after the NDP was banned by the government. She opposed the minority government of Ian Smith and campaigned internationally against the minority white rule in Rhodesia. In October 1964, she was arrested by Rhodesian authorities and was convicted. In January 1972, she was arrested again and sent to a jail in Marandellas. Her father was arrested at the same time and went to jail in Gatooma. During her imprisonment, she briefly went on hunger strike in protest against their detention, but relented after enduring several incidents of force-feeding. Several weeks later, both were released and were subsequently expelled from the country, becoming personae non gratae. She relocated to London. In 1978 she was among the founding members of Zimbabwe Project Trust, a humanitarian organization connected to the Roman Catholic Church. It was founded to help Zimbabwean refugees. Her exile lasted until all detentions were lifted in February 1980 under the process leading to the  independence of Zimbabwe. The trust relocated from London to Zimbabwe and Todd was appointed director, a position she held until 1987. The trust's focus shifted to humanitarian aid, especially relocation and training of liberation war ex-combatants.

In 1984 Todd was raped by a senior officer in Mugabe's military on his orders, after she criticised the genocide of Ndebele civilians, the traditional opponents of Mugabe's own tribe.

She became a strong critic of the regime of Robert Mugabe. After an unsuccessful candidature for a seat in parliament for the Zimbabwe African People's Union (ZAPU) she worked as a journalist. She was a founding shareholder of the Daily News newspaper in 1999. The newspaper was banned in 2003 and, in the same year, Todd was stripped of her Zimbabwean citizenship, when she was unable to comply with a court order to renounce her potential dual nationality because of her parents' birth in New Zealand. As Todd had never had New Zealand nationality, she was unable to renounce it. The temporary passport she had been issued was not renewed and she became stateless for a decade, until the nationality law was changed in 2013 to allow Zimbabweans to be dual nationals.

Publications

Notes and references

External links
Website of the Zimbabwe Project Trust

1943 births
Living people
People from Zvishavane
Spouses of life peers
White Zimbabwean politicians
Zimbabwean exiles
Zimbabwean people of British descent
Zimbabwean people of English descent
Zimbabwe African People's Union politicians
White Rhodesian people
Prisoners and detainees of Rhodesia
20th-century Zimbabwean people
20th-century Zimbabwean women politicians
20th-century Zimbabwean politicians
21st-century Zimbabwean people
Zimbabwean activists
Rhodesian activists
Hunger strikers